M137 may refer to:

M-137 (Michigan highway), a state highway
Mercedes-Benz M137 engine, an automobile engine
LOM M137, a Czech aircraft engine
 M137 (Cape Town), a Metropolitan Route in Cape Town, South Africa